Nathalie Nicole Paulding is an actress; she has performed in American theatre, film, and television.

Early life
Living in Hollywood, Florida, in 1994, Paulding was enrolled in the Little Flower Montessori School in Fort Lauderdale, Florida, at age 9.

Career
Paulding has made several appearances in film, television and theatre since the early 1990s.

Performance credits

Theatre
 Les Misérables (1994), Young Eponine & Young Cosette (a Broadway production at the Imperial Theatre)
 The Miracle Worker (1996), Helen Keller (a revival production at the George Street Playhouse)
 Summer and Smoke (1996), young Alma Winemiller (a Broadway revival production by the Roundabout Theatre Company at the Criterion Center Stage Right in New York City)
 The Devils (1997), Matryosha (an off-Broadway production at the New York Theatre Workshop)
 The Diary of Anne Frank (1997—1998), Anne Frank (replacing Natalie Portman in the Broadway revival production at the Music Box Theatre)
 Lake Hollywood (1999), Monica (an off-Broadway production by the Signature Theatre Company at the Peter Norton Space)
 The Member of the Wedding (2005), Frankie Addams (at the Ford's Theatre)
 In May 2006, Paulding participated in the 24th annual Young Playwrights Festival, a three-week engagement of new plays by writers age 18 or younger, hosted by Young Playwrights Inc. — founded by Stephen Sondheim — at the Peter Jay Sharp Theatre at Symphony Space.

Television
 All My Children (1997–98), Bianca Montgomery - recurring role
 Third Watch (1999), Sunny - episodes "Hell is What You Make of It" and "Sunny, Like Sunshine"
 Law & Order: Special Victims Unit (2003), Patty Swanson - "Mercy"
 Cold Case (2005), Quinn Ellis (1988) - episode "Family"

Film
 Bully (2001), Claudia
 Bringing Rain (2003), Mu
 The Life Before Her Eyes (2008), Amanda

References

External links
 
 
 

Actresses from Florida 
Living people
People from Hollywood, Florida

1985 births
American child actresses
American soap opera actresses
American stage actresses
American television actresses
21st-century American women